Barbados competed at the 2015 Pan American Games in Toronto, Ontario, Canada from July 10 to 26, 2015.

A team of 29 athletes (18 men and 11 women) competing in 10 sports was announced by the Barbados Olympic Association on July 2, 2015. This marked a reduction of 23 athletes from the last edition of the games in 2011. This is primarily because both field hockey teams (which consisted of 32 athletes in 2011) failed to qualify. Tennis player Darian King was the flagbearer for the team during the opening ceremony.

Competitors
The following table lists Barbados' delegation per sport and gender.

Medalists

The following competitors from Barbados won medals at the games. In the by discipline sections below, medalists' names are bolded.

|  style="text-align:left; width:78%; vertical-align:top;"|

|  style="text-align:left; width:22%; vertical-align:top;"|

Athletics

Barbados qualified 14 athletes (seven of each gender) down from an initial list of 18, after organizers had to reduce team sizes to the quota of 680 athletes.

Men

Women

Field events

Badminton

Barbados qualified a team of two athletes (one man and one woman).

Boxing

Barbados qualified one male boxer.

Men

Equestrian

Barbados qualified one athlete.

Jumping

Golf

Barbados qualified one golfer.

Men

Shooting

Barbados qualified two shooters.

Swimming

Barbados qualified three swimmers.

Tennis

Barbados qualified three male athletes.

Men

Triathlon

Barbados qualified one male triathlete.

Men

Weightlifting

Barbados received one wildcard.

Men

See also
Barbados at the 2015 Parapan American Games
Barbados at the 2016 Summer Olympics

References

Nations at the 2015 Pan American Games
2015
Pan American Games